Matilda Elizabeth "Tilly" Keeper (born 16 August 1997) is an English actress, known for her role as Louise Mitchell on the BBC soap opera EastEnders. Shortly after leaving the soap, Keeper appeared in the BBC film Make Me Famous and has since been cast in the thriller Marooned Awakening and the Netflix series You.

Early life
Keeper was born in London, England to Peter, one of the Spitting Image writers, and Amanda. Keeper also has two brothers. She attended the D&B Academy of Performing Arts School in Bromley for 14 years, a school owned by her aunties. From the age of 4, Keeper took ballet lessons, before joining their agency at the age of 7. Keeper attended Bromley High School.

Career
Keeper began her career in 2004 when she made appearances in television advertisements. She then made her debut stage appearance in a production of Dick Whittington. She then made her television debut as an uncredited school student in an episode of the ITV procedural drama The Bill. She then appeared in a theatre production of Oliver from March to July 2009, where she played a member of the Sovereign's team. In 2014, she appeared as a dancer in the film Cuban Fury, and later appeared in an Oral-B advert and the 2015 short film Female Dog. In 2016, Keeper made her television debut in an episode of the CBBC series Millie Inbetween. 

In December 2015, Keeper was cast in the role of Louise Mitchell in the BBC soap opera EastEnders, appearing from 15 January 2016. Her storylines have included her father Phil's (Steve McFadden) alcoholism, being in a bus crash, getting caught in a fire causing her to have permanent burns, her mother's mental health issues, getting kidnapped, and becoming pregnant with Keanu Taylor's (Danny Walters) child. In December 2019, it was announced that Keeper had made the decision to depart from EastEnders, with her final scenes airing on 24 January 2020. In April 2020, it was announced that Keeper would star in the BBC Three film Make Me Famous as Helen Cott. On her casting, she stated: "I'm thrilled to be a part of this project. It's a really important story that I think we could all learn something from."

In 2021, she co-starred in the short film True Colours alongside Amy-Leigh Hickman. She then starred in the short film Do This For Me as Kat. In June 2021, it was announced that Keeper would star as Emily in the British psychological thriller Marooned Awakening. Principal photography took place on the island of Guernsey in September 2021. The film premiered in September 2022. In 2022, it was announced that Keeper had been cast in the fourth series of the Netflix series You.

Stage

Filmography

Awards and nominations

References

External links

 

1997 births
21st-century English actresses
Actresses from London
English soap opera actresses
English television actresses
English child actresses
Living people
People educated at Bromley High School
People from Bromley